"Everybody Gonfi-Gon" is a song by Italian Eurodance project Two Cowboys. It was released in June 1994 as the project's debut single. Drawing comparisons to other string-driven country-dance hits at the time, including The Grid's "Swamp Thing" and "Cotton Eye Joe" by Rednex, "Everybody Gonfi-Gon" became a hit single as well, reaching number two in Finland and Iceland and peaking within the top 10 in Austria, Denmark, Ireland, the Netherlands, and the United Kingdom.

Critical reception
Andy Beevers from Music Week gave the song four out of five. He wrote, "This irritating house hoe-down from Italy is threatening to be the next Doop. It has a Western flavour similar to The Grid's Banjo and Bravado's Harmonica Man but is far more cheesy. It was initially snapped up for UK releases by 3-Beat, although it has been sub-licensed to ffrr to make the most of its chart potential." James Hamilton from the magazine's RM Dance Update deemed it a "madly happy fiddle and banjo prodded galloping square dance/disco hybrid".

Track listings
CD single
 "Everybody Gonfi-Gon" (New New Atlantic Edit) – 3:06
 "Everybody Gonfi-Gon" (New New Atlantic Mix) – 5:55
 "Everybody Gonfi-Gon" – 4:32
 "Everybody Gonfi-Gon" (Valencia Mix) – 5:13

German maxi-CD
 "Everybody Gonfi-Gon" (Video Version) – 3:02
 "Everybody Gonfi-Gon" (Costa del Sol Mix) – 4:44
 "Everybody Gonfi-Gon" (New Atlantic Mix) – 6:04
 "Everybody Gonfi-Gon" (Bailamos Mix) – 5:12
 "Everybody Gonfi-Gon" (Valencia Version) – 4:44

Swiss maxi-CD
 "Everybody Gonfi-Gon" (Costa del Sol Radio Mix) – 3:56
 "Everybody Gonfi-Gon" (Costa del Sol Dance Version) – 4:46
 "Everybody Gonfi-Gon" (Valencia Radio Edit) – 3:56
 "Everybody Gonfi-Gon" (Valencia Dance Version) – 4:46

Charts

Weekly charts

Year-end charts

References

1994 debut singles
1994 songs
English-language Italian songs
FFRR Records singles
House music songs
Music Week number-one dance singles